Prasad Murella is an Indian film cinematographer, who mainly works for Telugu cinema. He started his career in the Tamil film industry.

Personal life 
He was born in Vijayawada where he completed his schooling and his higher studies. Due to his passion for films, he travelled to Chennai and assisted many cinematographers, such as Ravi Yadav and D. Shanker.

Career 
He started his career with the Tamil film Azhagana Naatkal directed by Sundar C. in 2000. Later he made his debut in Telugu with the film Venky, directed by Srinu Vaitla in 2004, and shot another film called Chanti in the same year. He went back to Tamil films in 2004 with Devathayai Kanden and was there until the year 2006 working for the films Chinna and Rendu.

In 2007, he started shooting Telugu films with the film Dhee and has remained in this film industry. He was awarded with the 2010 Nandi Award for Best Cinematographer for the film Namo Venkatesa. It is an award given by Andhra Pradesh state government. He also won the SIIMA Award for Best Cinematographer (Telugu) for the 2013 film Attharintiki Daaredhi

Filmography

See also
 Indian cinematographers

References

External links
 

1968 births
Living people
Artists from Vijayawada
Telugu film cinematographers
Tamil film cinematographers
Film directors from Andhra Pradesh
21st-century Indian photographers
21st-century Indian film directors
Cinematographers from Andhra Pradesh
People from Andhra Pradesh
People from Krishna district